Poloz is a surname. Notable people with the surname include:

 Dmitry Poloz (born 1991), Russian footballer
 Dušan Poloz (born 1965), Slovak handball coach
 Mykhailo Poloz (1891–1937), Ukrainian politician, diplomat, and statesman
 Stephen Poloz (born 1955), Canadian banker
 Vladislav Poloz (born 2001), Belarusian footballer